Self-fabric, in sewing, is a fabric piece or embellishment made from the same fabric as the main fabric, as opposed to contrast fabric.

Self-fabric used for some pattern pieces such as facings and linings to produce clean garment lines and make the fabric piece blend in with the rest of the garment. Fabric-covered buttons and the welts of a bound buttonhole can be created using self-fabric to minimize their visibility.

Self-fabric can also be used to make design details stand out.  For example, a patch pocket on a coat could be made of contrasting fabric, but have an appliqué made of self-fabric on the pocket.  A very common use of self-fabric as an embellishment is to make two garments that are to be worn together out of different fabrics and use self-fabric from one garment as a trim on the other (such as piping).

References

Sewing